Volodarsky District is an administrative and municipal district (raion), one of the eleven in Astrakhan Oblast, Russia. It is located in the south of the oblast. Its administrative center is the rural locality (a settlement) of Volodarsky. Population:  47,351 (2002 Census);  The population of the administrative center accounts for 20.9% of the district's total population.

Kazakhs are the dominant ethnic group in the district and make up around 68% of its population. Ethnic minorities include ethnic Russians (29%) and Tatars (2%).

References

Notes

Sources

Districts of Astrakhan Oblast